Máximo González and Fabrício Neis were the defending champions but only Neis chose to defend his title, partnering David Vega Hernández. Neis successfully defended his title.

Neis and Vega Hernández won the title after defeating Henri Laaksonen and Luca Margaroli 4–6, 6–4, [10–8] in the final.

Seeds

Draw

References
 Main Draw

Marburg Open - Doubles
2018 Doubles